Alain Pichon (born April 17, 1964) is a former French para table tennis player. He is a triple world champion, triple European champion and multi-medalist Paralympian.

References

External links 
 

1964 births
Living people
Sportspeople from Caen
Paralympic table tennis players of France
Table tennis players at the 1992 Summer Paralympics
Table tennis players at the 1996 Summer Paralympics
Table tennis players at the 2000 Summer Paralympics
Table tennis players at the 2004 Summer Paralympics
Table tennis players at the 2008 Summer Paralympics
Medalists at the 1992 Summer Paralympics
Medalists at the 1996 Summer Paralympics
Medalists at the 2000 Summer Paralympics
Medalists at the 2004 Summer Paralympics
Medalists at the 2008 Summer Paralympics
Paralympic medalists in table tennis
Paralympic gold medalists for France
Paralympic silver medalists for France
Paralympic bronze medalists for France
French male table tennis players
20th-century French people
21st-century French people